WNRS (1420 AM) is a radio station broadcasting a Spanish language tropical music format. Licensed to Herkimer, New York, United States, the station serves the Utica area. Owned by Arjuna Broadcasting Corp., the station also simulcasts on translator station W252DO at 98.3 FM.

The format is known as El Zorro 98.3 FM 1420 AM.

History
The station went on the air as WALY in 1956, often programming a full service music format. However, on occasion, it would program other formats like top 40. Eventually, the station settled for beautiful music programming. The station changed callsigns several times in the late 1970s and 1980s, to WKYZ in 1979, WRMV in 1980, and WLIR in 1985. On March 2, 1987, the station changed its call sign to WYUT to match its FM sister WYUT-FM, but signed off in 1991. On July 20, 1994, both WYUT and WYUT-FM returned to the air as WNRS and WXUR, respectively. On June 26, 2009, Arjuna Broadcasting Corp. moved the Imus in the Morning show to WNRS from WXUR, which had just flipped to an active rock format.

On March 4, 2013, WNRS dropped its Premiere and Bloomberg affiliations and affiliated with The True Oldies Channel. Imus in the Morning was once again retained (and would continue on WNRS until the show ended on March 29, 2018). When the True Oldies Channel ended in June 2014, WNRS retained its oldies format and changed its affiliation to Good Time Oldies, which had recently been launched by Westwood One.

On December 1, 2016, WNRS added an FM simulcast at 98.3, to cover areas not served by WNRS' nighttime signal.

November 1, 2020, WNRS dropped its oldies format in favor of Spanish-language tropical music; such a format had never before been heard in Central New York. With the format change came new branding as "El Zorro" - the Spanish word for "Fox".

References

External links

NRS
Radio stations established in 1956
1956 establishments in New York (state)
Tropical music radio stations
NRS (AM)